Santiago de Chiquitos Airport  is a public use airport serving the town of Santiago de Chiquitos in the Santa Cruz Department of Bolivia.

See also

Transport in Bolivia
List of airports in Bolivia

References

External links 
OpenStreetMap - Santiago de Chiquitos
OurAirports - Santiago de Chiquitos
Fallingrain - Santiago de Chiquitos Airport

Airports in Santa Cruz Department (Bolivia)